Gozdów may refer to the following places:
Gozdów, Koło County in Greater Poland Voivodeship (west-central Poland)
Gozdów, Łódź Voivodeship (central Poland)
Gozdów, Lublin Voivodeship (east Poland)
Gozdów, Turek County in Greater Poland Voivodeship (west-central Poland)